This is a list of the Spanish Singles number-ones of 2002.

Chart history

See also
2002 in music
List of number-one hits (Spain)

References

2002
Spain Singles
Number-one singles